Shaun David Cooper (born 5 October 1983) is an English retired professional footballer. He is the current manager of  club AFC Bournemouth's Development Squad/u23 side.

Career
Cooper was a product of Portsmouth's youth system. He made his debut for the club in a 0–0 draw at Crystal Palace in March 2002 and featured in six more games in the remainder of the campaign. However, he failed to break into the first team the next season, as Portsmouth won the Division One title. Despite this he was offered a new two-year contract. He spent most of the 2003–04 season on loan at Leyton Orient, playing nine games.

The next season (2004–05) he was again loaned out, this time to Kidderminster Harriers.

Cooper left the club in June 2005, signing for AFC Bournemouth on a free transfer. After spending seven years at the club, he was offered a new contract at a reduced wage by new manager Paul Groves; turning this down, he left the club.

On 25 June 2012, Cooper joined Crawley Town on a free transfer. Six months later, he joined Portsmouth on loan. He scored his first goal for Portsmouth on 13 April 2013, against Brentford. It was subsequently confirmed that his contract with Crawley would not be renewed at the end of the season, and Cooper thus became a free agent.
In July 2013, he had a trial at Torquay United, but failed to earn a contract.

Cooper re-joined Portsmouth until January 2014 on 5 September 2013, for his third spell with the club.

On 9 January 2014 Portsmouth confirmed that Cooper had left the club following the expiration of his short-term contract.

On 17 January 2014, Cooper signed for Torquay United on a potential 18-month contract.

Cooper's contract with Torquay United was cancelled by mutual consent in July 2014.

Cooper switched to Sutton United for the 2014/15 season and signed on a months loan to Eastbourne Borough in September 2016.

Career statistics

References

External links

1983 births
Living people
English footballers
Association football defenders
Portsmouth F.C. players
Leyton Orient F.C. players
Kidderminster Harriers F.C. players
AFC Bournemouth players
Crawley Town F.C. players
Torquay United F.C. players
Sutton United F.C. players
Eastbourne Borough F.C. players
English Football League players
National League (English football) players
AFC Bournemouth non-playing staff